Bobs Lake is a lake in the James Bay and Abitibi River drainage basins in Cochrane District in northeastern Ontario, Canada.

The primary outflow is Bobs Creek at the southeast, which flows via the Shallow River and the Black River to the Abitibi River.

See also
List of lakes in Ontario

References

Lakes of Cochrane District